Shaul Avigur (11 September 1899 – 29 August 1978) was a founder of the Israeli Intelligence Community.

Biography
Avigur was born in Dvinsk (now Daugavpils in Latvia) under the name Saul Meyeroff (later Meirov), but when his son Gur Meyeroff was killed in the 1948 Arab–Israeli War, he changed it to Avigur, meaning "Father of Gur". Along with Reuven Shiloah, Avigur was instrumental in forming SHAI, the intelligence wing of the Haganah, in 1934. Since 1939 he was involved in the Mossad Le'aliyah Bet operations to smuggle Jews into the British Mandate of Palestine and was named its commander.  During the  1948 Arab–Israeli War, he acted as David Ben-Gurion's deputy defense minister. In 1953 he was appointed the founding head of the "Liaison Bureau" (Lishkat Hakesher), also known as "Nativ", an Israeli organization that maintained contact with Jews in the Soviet Union during the Cold War. He headed the organization until 1970. Avigur was the brother-in-law of former Prime Minister Moshe Sharett.

Awards
In 1973, Avigur was awarded the Israel Prize, for his special contribution to society and the State.

See also
 List of Israel Prize recipients
 Nehemiah Levanon (1915–2003), Nativ operative in the USSR

Notes

References

1899 births
1978 deaths
Military personnel from Daugavpils
People from Dvinsky Uyezd
Jews from the Russian Empire
Emigrants from the Russian Empire to the Ottoman Empire
Ashkenazi Jews in Ottoman Palestine
Ashkenazi Jews in Mandatory Palestine
Aliyah Bet activists
Haganah members
People of Israeli intelligence agencies
Israel Prize for special contribution to society and the State recipients